The 1974 Maine Black Bears football team represented the University of Maine in the 1974 NCAA Division II football season. They were led by eighth-year head coach Walter Abbott and finished the season with an overall record of 4–6 and a 4–2 mark in the Yankee Conference. Maine shared the conference title with UMass.

Schedule

References

Maine
Maine Black Bears football seasons
Yankee Conference football champion seasons
Maine Black Bears football